MV John Paul DeJoria (formerly USCGC Block Island (WPB-1344)) was a cutter class vessel owned and operated by the Sea Shepherd Conservation Society. She is being used in their direct action campaigns against illegal fisheries activities.

They were USCGC Block Island and USCGC Pea Island, and were renamed MV Jules Verne and  after famous authors, respectively.

Jules Verne was then renamed MV John Paul DeJoria on 31 January 2017, honouring Sea Shepherd supporter John Paul DeJoria. Under the new name, the ship's first mission was to join the search for the missing filmmaker Rob Stewart in the Florida Keys.

John Paul DeJoria II

In December 2023, it was announced that the former Scottish Fisheries Protection Agency patrol vessel 'Vigilant' had been acquired and re-named John Paul DeJoria.

See also
 Neptune's Navy, Sea Shepherd boats
 Sea Shepherd Conservation Society operations

References

External links
 Sea Shepherd Worldwide Fleet

Sea Shepherd Conservation Society ships
Island-class patrol boats
1980s ships
Ships built in Lockport, Louisiana